Denise C. Garlick (née Collatos) is an American state legislator representing the 13th Norfolk District in the Massachusetts House of Representatives.

Garlick was graduated from Dedham High School in 1972.  She is a Needham resident and a member of the Democratic Party. In 2017, she was honored as the Massachusetts Developmental Disabilities Council's Legislator of the Year.  She is also a registered nurse.

See also
 2019–2020 Massachusetts legislature
 2021–2022 Massachusetts legislature

References

External links
Official website

Living people
Democratic Party members of the Massachusetts House of Representatives
Women state legislators in Massachusetts
Politicians from Needham, Massachusetts
21st-century American politicians
21st-century American women politicians
Year of birth missing (living people)
Fitchburg State University alumni